Gheorghe Gheorghiu-Dej (8 November 1901 – 19 March 1965) was a Romanian communist politician and electrician. He was the first Communist leader of Romania from 1947 to 1965, serving as first secretary of the Romanian Communist Party (ultimately "Romanian Workers' Party", PMR) from 1944 to 1954 and from 1955 to 1965, and as the first Communist Prime Minister of Romania from 1952 to 1955.

Born in Bârlad (1901), Gheorghiu-Dej was involved in the communist movement's activities from the early 1930s. Upon the outbreak of World War II in Europe, he was imprisoned by Ion Antonescu's regime in the Târgu Jiu detention camp, and escaped only in August 1944. After the forces of King Michael ousted Antonescu and had him arrested for war crimes, Gheorghiu-Dej together with prime-minister Petru Groza pressured the King into abdicating in December 1947, marking the onset of out-and-out Communist rule in Romania.

Under his rule, Romania was considered one of the Soviet Union's most loyal satellite states, though Gheorghiu-Dej was partially unnerved by the rapid de-Stalinization policy initiated by Nikita Khrushchev at the end of the 1950s. Gheorghiu-Dej stepped up measures that greatly increased trade relations between Romania and the Western countries. However, at the same time his government was accused of human rights violations within the country.

He died of lung cancer in March 1965. His once protégé Nicolae Ceaușescu succeeded him as General Secretary.

Early life 
Gheorghiu-Dej was the son of a poor worker from Bârlad, Tănase Gheorghiu, and his wife Ana. He also had a younger sister named Tinca.

Worker and union organizer
Poverty made him leave school early on and start working at the age of 11. Due to his age and the lack of professional training, he often changed jobs, eventually settling to be an electrician. Working at a factory in Comănești, he joined the workers' union and participated in the 1920 Romanian general strike, during which all the participants were dismissed.

A year later, he was hired as an electrician at the Galați tramway company, where he was also fired after organizing protests against the 9-hour workday and for higher wages. He was later hired by the Romanian Railways (CFR) workshops in Galați.

As the workers' standard of living was already low, the Great Depression in Romania began eroding it much more so. In 1930, Gheorghiu became more politically active, joining the Communist Party of Romania. He was assigned to organize agitation in the Romanian Railways workshops in Moldavia.

On 15 August 1931 Gheorghiu was accused of "communist agitation" and punitively transferred to Dej, a town in Transylvania, where he continued the union activity. The union presented a petition in February 1932 to the CFR Railways, demanding better working conditions and higher wages. As a response, the CFR Railways closed down the Dej plant and fired all the workers, including Gheorghiu, who was deprived of the opportunity to be hired by any other CFR Railways workshop in the country.

Activist
During this time, Gheorghiu got the moniker Gheorghiu-Dej from the Siguranța (secret police), in order for his name to be differentiated from other union activists called Gheorghiu. After his dismissal from the CFR Railways workshop, Gheorghiu became even more active in organizing the unions and coordinating the workers of Iași, Pașcani, and Galați.

On the night of 14–15 July 1932 he was arrested for placing "subversive posters on the walls and poles of Giulești Road", being held in the Văcărești prison. Defended by lawyer Iosif Schraier, he was freed because the posters were meant to be related to the elections, during the electoral campaign for the 1932 Romanian general election.

Gheorghiu-Dej was briefly arrested again on 3 October 1932, at the end of a workers' meeting in Iași, after he urged the workers to "unite for the fight against the capitalist class", on alleged charges of having hit a police commissioner. He was freed as the charges were found to be false.

In January 1933, the Romanian Government announced some even more stringent austerity measures that included new wages cuts, which led to the radicalization of the workers. Gheorghiu-Dej, together with union president Constantin Doncea, led the Bucharest workers to the big strike that became known as the CFR Railways Grivița Strike of 1933.

As the negotiations failed, the government feared a general strike, so it declared a state of siege in Bucharest and other cities. Gheorghiu-Dej was arrested during the night of 14–15 February 1933.

In prison

Gheorghiu-Dej was sentenced to prison in the same year by a military court, serving time in Doftana and in other facilities. In 1936 he was elected to the party's Central Committee and became leader of the prison faction of the communist party (party members who were incarcerated in Romania, a term distinguishing them from party members living in exile, mainly in the Soviet Union: the Muscovite faction).

As a known activist, he was detained at Târgu Jiu camp during all of Ion Antonescu's regime and most of World War II period, and escaped only on 10 August 1944, a few days before the fall of the regime. He became general secretary in 1944 after the Soviet occupation, but did not consolidate his power until 1952, after he purged Ana Pauker and her Muscovite faction comrades from power. Ana Pauker had been the unofficial leader of the Party since the end of the war.

While in prison, Gheorghiu-Dej met Nicolae Ceaușescu. They were imprisoned after a rally organized by the communist party, of which both Ceaușescu and Gheorghiu-Dej were members. Gheorghiu-Dej taught Ceaușescu in prison Marxist-Leninist theories and principles, and kept him close as Gheorghiu-Dej steadily gained power after their release from prison in 1944. During 1946–1947, he was a member of Romania's Gheorghe Tătărescu-led delegation to the Paris Peace Conference.

In power

Under Soviet directives
On 30 December 1947, Gheorghiu-Dej and Prime Minister Petru Groza forced King Michael I to abdicate. Years later, Albanian Communist leader Enver Hoxha alleged that Gheorghiu-Dej personally pulled a gun on the King and threatened to kill him unless he gave up the throne. Hours later, Parliament, fully dominated by Communists and their allies after the elections held a year earlier, abolished the monarchy and declared Romania a People's Republic. From this moment onward, Gheorghiu-Dej was de facto the most powerful man in Romania.

Soviet influence in Romania under Joseph Stalin favored Gheorghiu-Dej, largely seen as a local leader with strong Marxist-Leninist principles. The economic influence of Moscow was protected by the creation of the "Sov-Rom" companies, which directed Romania's commercial exchanges to unprofitable markets (mainly the Soviet Union).

Up until Stalin's death and even afterwards, Gheorghiu-Dej did not amend repressive policies, such as the works employing penal labor on the Danube-Black Sea Canal. On orders from Gheorghiu-Dej, Romania implemented also the massive forced collectivization of land in the rural areas. Gheorghiu-Dej was also responsible for purging other party colleagues like Ana Pauker and her allies in the Secretariat: Vasile Luca and Teohari Georgescu, who was scapegoated and blamed for many political and economical failures during his rule.

Personal rule

The first five years of the Romanian People's Republic saw a period of collective leadership, with fellow traveler Groza serving as prime minister. However, in 1952, Groza stepped down from the premiership and became chairman of the presidium of the Great National Assembly (de facto president). Gheorghiu-Dej succeeded him, becoming the first Communist to hold the post. He thus combined the two most powerful posts in Romania in his own hands, with full Soviet approval.

Gheorghiu-Dej briefly gave up the first secretaryship of the Communist Party in 1954 to Gheorghe Apostol, retaining the premiership.  However, he was still the actual leader of Romania, and he regained the party leadership in 1955, at the same time handing the premiership to Chivu Stoica. In 1961, he became president of the newly created State Council, making him de jure head of state. However, he had already been de facto head of state since 1947 by virtue of his leadership of the Communist Party.

Gheorghiu-Dej was at first unsettled by Nikita Khrushchev's reforms in the new process of De-Stalinization. He then became the architect of Romania's semi-autonomous foreign and economic policy within the Warsaw Pact and the Comecon, in the late 1950s, notably by initiating the creation of a heavy industry in Romania which went against Soviet directions for the Eastern Bloc as a whole (e.g., the new large-scale steel plant in Galați, which relied on iron resources imported from India and Australia). Ironically, Romania under Gheorghiu-Dej was once considered one of the most loyal among the Soviet satellites, and thus there is a tendency to forget "who first established the pattern of foreign policy openness and 'liberalness' coupled with domestic repression." The ideological steps undertaken were made clear by the ousting of the "Sov-Rom" companies, together with the toning down of Soviet-Romanian common cultural ventures. In 1958 the Red Army withdrew its last troops from Romania (a personal achievement of Gheorghiu-Dej). The official History of Romania made then reference to a Romanian Bessarabia, as well as other topics which tensed relations between the two communist countries. Moreover, the final years of Dej's regime saw the publishing of Karl Marx texts, which had previously been kept secret, dealing with Russia's imperial policy in previously Romanian regions that were still part of the Soviet Union.

Yet, the Securitate was still Dej's instrument of choice, and Romania joined the other Warsaw Pact countries' wave of repression after the Hungarian Revolution of 1956 – incidentally, Hungarian leader Imre Nagy was shortly detained on Romanian soil.

In his late years, Gheorghiu-Dej established diplomatic relations with the First World, including the United States. Such steps were highly encouraged by the president Lyndon B. Johnson, who had come to see Romania as an almost friendly Communist country in the Cold War context (1963). Also, 1964 was the year many political prisoners were released.

Interaction with the West
In the early years of Gheorghiu-Dej's rule Romania's relations with the West were tense, marked by accusations of United States espionage and Romanian human rights violations. There were also low levels of trade between Romania and the West, as Romania tied itself to the Soviet Union and the other satellite nations; in 1950, Romania's economic plan involved 89% of trade to be solely with the Soviet Bloc.

Later, however, Romania's willingness to trade with the West became more apparent. For example, 1952 saw the first publication of the journal Romanian Foreign Trade, which offered opportunities to Western traders to buy Romanian goods, such as petroleum and grain. Western publications also recognized the potential for Romania to sell its products on the world market. An article from The Times of 29 August 1953 wrote: "[Romania] could, for instance, it is thought, obtain higher prices on the world market for much of what she is forced to export to Russia, foodstuffs included, in return for machinery and aid."  As Gheorghiu-Dej realized, if Romania were able to trade with the West the standard of living would likely rise.

From 1953, the West gradually relaxed their export controls, which had limited the products that the U.S., Great Britain, and France could export to Eastern Europe. Gheorghiu-Dej, eager to establish interaction between Romania and the West, relaxed travel restraints on Western diplomats in Bucharest and allowed Western journalists more access to Romania. In early 1954, Romania also appealed to Great Britain about having talks to resolve Romania's outstanding claims, to which Great Britain agreed in December of that year.

Romania's foreign policy towards the West was closely tied to its policy toward the Soviet Union; Romania could only develop trading with the West if it asserted its independence from the intensely anti-West Soviet Union. Gheorghiu-Dej realized this, and thus emphasized Romania's sovereignty. In the Second Party Congress, which opened on 23 December 1955, Gheorghiu-Dej gave a five-hour speech in which he stressed the idea of national communism and Romania's right to follow its own interests, rather than be forced to follow another's (referring to the Soviet Union). Gheorghiu-Dej also discussed opening up trade with the West.  In an attempt to increase the dialogue between Romania and the West, in 1956 Gheorghiu-Dej instructed the new ambassador to the U.S. to meet with both Secretary of State John Foster Dulles and then with President Dwight D. Eisenhower. As a result of these meetings, the U.S. Department of State expressed interest in increasing the interaction between the two nations, including possibly establishing a library in Bucharest.

Romania's interaction with the West temporarily decreased, however, with the 1956 Hungarian Revolution and the violent response of the Soviet Union to the uprising. Still, Gheorghiu-Dej continued to strengthen the independence from the Soviet Union. For example, Romanian schools dropped the Russian language requirement. And, obviously, Romania endorsed the Moscow Declaration of 1957 which stated that "Socialist countries base their relations on the principles of complete equality, respect for territorial integrity, state independence and sovereignty, and non-interference in one another's affairs… The socialist states also advocate the general expansion of economic and cultural relations with all other countries…" These statements coincided with Gheorghiu-Dej's claims to national sovereignty and independence.

In fact, by 1957 Romania had substantially increased its Western trade; in that year trade with the West had increased to 25% of Romania's total trade. By the early 1960s, Romania under Gheorghiu-Dej was more industrialized and productive. After World War II 80% of the population had worked in agriculture, but by 1963, 65% did. And, despite the decrease in hands working the land, agricultural productivity had actually increased. Additionally, Gheorghiu-Dej had successfully begun a strong shift in trade towards the West, further separating it from the Soviet Union; Romania imported much of its industrial equipment from West Germany, Great Britain, and France. This trade pattern followed Gheorghiu-Dej's economic plan, which he made clear to Great Britain and France in 1960, when he sent his head of foreign intelligence to Paris and London in order to clarify Romania's desire to interact with the West and disregard Comecon orders.

By 1964 Gheorghiu-Dej had made a trading agreement with the U.S. that allowed Romania to buy industrial products from them. The agreement came as a result of U.S. businesses' complaints that they were losing money to Western Europe. During his presidency, President  John F. Kennedy, concerned with these businesses' losses, used his powers to increase trade between the U.S. and Eastern Europe, a policy which President Lyndon Johnson also followed.

Thus, Gheorghiu-Dej greatly increased trade with the West, making Romania the first Soviet Bloc country to trade with the West, completely independently. Through his policy of national sovereignty, Gheorghiu-Dej increased the popularity of Romania in the West. National U.S. publications moved away from reports in the early 1950s of human rights abuses and oppression, towards articles from the mid-1950s to the early 1960s of Romanian de-satellization. In the early 1960s,  The Times also reported often on Gheorghiu-Dej's and Romania's increased economic ties with the West. Gheorghiu-Dej's successful efforts to expand Romania's foreign relations, especially those with the West, were evident at his March 1965 funeral, attended by 33 foreign delegations, including a special French envoy sent by General Charles de Gaulle. Gheorghiu-Dej's policies set the stage for his successor, Nicolae Ceaușescu, to carry Romania's new course even further.

Death and legacy 

Gheorghiu-Dej died of lung cancer in Bucharest on 19 March 1965. Gheorghe Apostol has claimed that Gheorghiu-Dej himself designated him party leader in waiting; in any case many perceived him as such in 1965. But Prime Minister Ion Gheorghe Maurer, who had developed hostility towards him, made sure that Apostol was prevented from taking power, rallying the Party leadership instead around longtime Gheorghiu-Dej protégé Nicolae Ceaușescu. Securitate general Ion Mihai Pacepa, who defected to the United States in 1978, wrote that Ceaușescu had allegedly told him about "ten international leaders the Kremlin killed or tried to kill"; Gheorghiu-Dej was among them.

Gheorghiu-Dej was buried in a mausoleum in Liberty Park (now Carol Park) in Bucharest. In 1991, after the Romanian Revolution, his body was exhumed and reburied at Bellu Cemetery. The Polytechnic Institute of Bucharest, renamed to Polytechnic Institute "Gheorghe Gheorghiu-Dej" Bucharest in his honor, is now known as the Politehnica University of Bucharest. In the early 1950s, one of the Sectors of Bucharest (roughly, the present-day Sector 6) was named after him. The city of Onești was once named Gheorghe-Gheorghiu Dej. Also, the Russian city of Liski was, from 1965 to 1990, named Georgiu-Dezh in his honor.

Gheorghiu-Dej was married to Maria Alexe and they had two daughters,  (1928–1987) and Constantina (1931–2000).

Notes

References

Primary sources
 Chicago Tribune, July 4, 1964; p. 11; Tito Socialism Wins Support in Balkans; Donald Starr.
 The Times, Saturday, August 29, 1953; p. 7; Issue 52713; col F. "Communism In Rumania Arrests And Collectives In A Satellite State From Our Special Correspondent".
 The Times, Saturday, May 11, 1963; p. 7; Issue 55698; col C. "Comecon Meets In Warsaw Preparing For Party Secretaries' Talks".
 The Times, Tuesday, Nov 26, 1963; p. 9; Issue 55868; col D. "Rumania Leader At Yugoslavia Steel Centre Power Project On Danube".
 The Times, Monday, Apr 13, 1964; p. 10; Issue 55984; col A. "Mr. Khrushchev's Allies To Meet This Week Rumania Still Stands Aloof From China Dispute From Our Special Correspondent".
 The Times, Monday, Jun 08, 1964; p. 10; Issue 56032; col F. "Signs Of Coming Russian Clash With Rumania Background To President Tito's Leningrad Visit Today From Our Own Correspondent".
 The Times, Friday, Dec 11, 1964; p. 13; Issue 56192; col F. "Rumanian Drive For Independence".
 The Times, Friday, Jan 22, 1965; p. 9; Issue 56226; col A. "Warsaw Pact Warning On M.L.F. Counter-Measures Threatened".
 The Times, Thursday, Mar 25, 1965; p. 10; Issue 56279; col E. "Rumania Affirms Independence".

Secondary sources

 

  

1901 births
1965 deaths
People from Bârlad
Heads of state of Romania
People of the Cold War
Prime Ministers of Romania
Deputy Prime Ministers of Romania
Romanian Ministers of Communications
Romanian Ministers of Economy
Romanian Ministers of Public Works
Members of the Chamber of Deputies (Romania)
General Secretaries of the Romanian Communist Party
State Council of Romania
Căile Ferate Române people
Inmates of Doftana prison
Inmates of Târgu Jiu camp
Romanian delegation to the Paris Peace Conference of 1946
Romanian communists
Communism in Romania
Romanian atheists
Politicide perpetrators
Burials at Bellu Cemetery
Deaths from cancer in Romania
Deaths from lung cancer